Singita is a South African company which operates game lodges in South Africa, Zimbabwe, Tanzania, and Rwanda. It owns game lodges in Sabi Sand Game Reserve, Kruger National Park, Malilangwe Wildlife Reserve, Grumeti Game Reserve, Serengeti National Park, and Volcanoes National Park.

History 
Singita is a Tsonga word that means "place of miracles".

Singita began in 1925 when Luke Bailes' grandfather bought a piece of land in what would later become the Sabi Sand Game Reserve in South Africa. The 45,000 acre reserve contains Singita’s first lodge, Singita Ebony Lodge, opened in 1993. Singita now manages 15 lodges and camps across six game reserves.

Accommodation

South Africa

Kruger National Park 
 Lebombo Lodge
 Sweni Lodge

Singita Sabi Sand 
 Ebony Lodge
 Castleton
 Boulders Lodge

Tanzania 

 Sasakwa Lodge
 Sabora Tented Camp
 Faru Faru Lodge
 Serengeti House
 Singita Explore
 Mara River Camp

Zimbabwe 

 Pamushana Lodge
Malilangwe House

Rwanda 

 Kwitonda Lodge
Kataza House

References 

Entertainment companies of South Africa
Privately held companies of South Africa
South African companies established in 1993